The 2002–03 Butler Bulldogs men's basketball team represented Butler University in the 2002–03 NCAA Division I men's basketball season. Their head coach was Todd Lickliter, serving his 2nd year. The Bulldogs played their home games at Hinkle Fieldhouse.

Roster

Schedule and results

|-
!colspan=9 style="background:#13294B; color:#FFFFFF;"| Regular season

|-
!colspan=9 style="background:#13294B; color:#FFFFFF;"| Horizon League tournament

|-
!colspan=9 style=| NCAA tournament

References

Butler
Butler Bulldogs men's basketball seasons
Butler
Butler Bulldogs men's basketball
Butler Bulldogs men's basketball